Gerald Patrick "Gerry" Hemming, Jr. (March 1, 1937 – January 28, 2008) was a former U.S. Marine, mercenary and Central Intelligence Agency asset within the Domestic Contact Division beginning in 1960, using the aliases Jerry Patrick, Gerry Patrick, Heming and Hannon. He was primarily involved in covert operations against Cuba.

Early background
One of eleven children, Hemming was born in Los Angeles, California on March 1, 1937. He attended El Monte Union High School in California before joining the United States Marine Corps in 1954.

Hemming left the Marines in October 1958 and the following year traveled to Cuba where he gave help to Fidel Castro and his revolutionary forces.

Hemming claimed that in January 1959 he met Lee Harvey Oswald at the Atsugi Naval Air Station in Japan. Hemming complained that Oswald boasted too much about his inside knowledge. For instance, upon their first meeting; Oswald tried to impress Hemming by showing off how much he knew about Hemming's background and mission - somebody in an intelligence capacity had briefed Lee Harvey Oswald, and Oswald sort of teased Hemming with this information. So, Hemming did not particularly enjoy the company of Oswald from the start.

Like many young Americans, including Frank Sturgis, David Ferrie and Harry Dean, Hemming joined an American effort to overthrow the Batista regime through the efforts of Fidel Castro. When Castro proved to be a Communist, and subjected some Americans to firing squads, most Americans "switched sides" and this included Gerry Patrick Hemming. who, in 1961, established Interpen as a means to attack and weaken the Castro regime. Other members of Interpen reportedly included Loran Hall, Roy Hargraves, William Seymour, Lawrence Howard, Steve Wilson, Howard K. Davis, Edwin Collins, James Arthur Lewis, Dennis Harber, Bill Dempsey, Dick Whatley, Ramigo Arce, Ronald Augustinovich, Joe Garman, Edmund Kolby, Ralph Schlafter, Manuel Aguilar and Oscar Del Pinto.

Interpen
Hemming was a leader of Interpen, or Intercontinental Penetration Force, a group of anti-Castro guerrillas who trained at No Name Key in the early 1960s.

Declassified FBI files show that the agency had an informer within Interpen. His code name was MM T-1. In one document dated June 16, 1961, it said that MM T-1 had "been connected with Cuban revolutionary activities for the past three years". One document dated May 12, 1961, claims that Allen Lushane of Miami "had made a trip to Texas to recruit Americans for some future military action against the Government of Cuba". The document adds that the "first training camp was established by Gerald Patrick Hemming with Dick Watley and Ed Colby running the camp." In an interview that he gave to John M. Newman on January 6, 1995, Hemming claimed that the FBI informer was Steve Wilson.

This group of experienced soldiers were involved in training members of the anti-Castro groups funded by the Central Intelligence Agency in Florida in the early 1960s. When the government began to crack down on raids from Florida in 1962, Interpen set up a new training camp in New Orleans, Louisiana. When this work came to an end in 1964 Hemming was employed in the construction industry in Miami.

During March and April 1972, while traveling in Guatemala, El Salvador, and Nicaragua, Hemming was able penetrate a conspiracy to assassinate the Chief Executives and Members of Congress of the Republic of Costa Rica, and the Chief Executive of the Republic of Panama.

Hemming and Lee Harvey Oswald
According to Victor Marchetti, he was also Lee Harvey Oswald's case officer at then-secret NAF Atsugi.

Gerry Hemming has granted long interviews with several writers working on the assassination of John F. Kennedy. These include Anthony Summers (Conspiracy), Noel Twyman (Bloody Treason) and John M. Newman (Oswald and the CIA). Some researchers believe that a combination of Interpen members and anti-Castro Cubans were involved in the assassination of John F. Kennedy. This included Hemming, James Arthur Lewis, Roy Hargraves, Edwin Collins, Steve Wilson, David Sanchez Morales, Herminio Diaz Garcia, Tony Cuesta, Eugenio Martinez, Virgilio Gonzalez, Felipe Vidal Santiago and William "Rip" Robertson.

Arms trading
Gerry Hemming was arrested on August 23, 1976, for the illegal transfer of a silencer and drug smuggling. It seems that this was the point that he began talking about his past work with the CIA. He told one reporter: "All of a sudden they're accusing me of conspiracy to import marijuana and cocaine. Hey, what about all the other things I've been into for the last 15 years, lets talk about them. Let's talk about the Martin Luther King thing, let's talk about Don Freed, Le Coubre, nigger-killers in bed with the Mafia, the Mafia in bed with the FBI, and the goddamn CIA in bed with all of them. Let's talk about all the people I dirtied up for them over the years."

1978 conviction and acquittal
Hemming was convicted by a Miami jury of conspiracy to import marijuana. In 1978 he was sentenced to six months in prison by U.S. District Judge William Hoeveler. Hemming was released on appeal bond and the conviction was later overturned.

In August, 1978, Victor Marchetti published an article about the assassination of John F. Kennedy in the Liberty Lobby newspaper, The Spotlight. In the article Marchetti argued that the House Select Committee on Assassinations (HSCA) had obtained a 1966 CIA memo that revealed Hemming, E. Howard Hunt, and Frank Sturgis had been involved in the plot to kill Kennedy. Marchetti's article also included a story that Marita Lorenz had provided information on this plot.

On April 14, 1980, Hemming was arrested and charged with drug trafficking. He was held on $200,000 bond in Palm Beach County, Florida. He claimed that he had not smuggled Quaaludes, but was establishing his bona fides with drug traffickers so he could penetrate their networks. Hemming told Alan J. Weberman that he was working for Mitchell Werbell III and Lucien Conein. Hemming was sentenced to 35 years in prison with a minimum mandatory sentence of three years but the conviction was later overturned on appeal.

Hunt decided to take legal action against the Liberty Lobby. In December, 1981, he was awarded $650,000 in damages. Liberty Lobby appealed to the United States Court of Appeals. It was claimed that Hunt's attorney, Ellis Rubin, had offered a clearly erroneous instruction as to the law of defamation. The three-judge panel agreed and the case was retried. This time Mark Lane defended the Liberty Lobby against Hunt's action.

Lane eventually discovered Marchetti's sources. The main source was William R. Corson. It also emerged that Marchetti had also consulted James Angleton and A. J. Weberman before publishing the article. As a result of obtaining depositions from David Atlee Phillips, Richard Helms, G. Gordon Liddy, Stansfield Turner, and Marita Lorenz, plus a skillful cross-examination by Lane of E. Howard Hunt, the jury decided in January, 1985, that Marchetti had not been guilty of libel when he suggested that John F. Kennedy had been assassinated by people working for the CIA. Lane stated that during a later meeting they had, Hemming corroborated the details of the assassination which were outlined during the trial.

Later life
Hemming became an active member of the JFK assassination research community later in life. He served for a time as official dignitary of the South Florida Research Group. In 1996 he participated in November in Dallas: The JFK-Lancer Conference on assassination research, hosted in Dallas from November 21 to 24. He delivered brief remarks before making himself available for questions from the panelists: Gordon Winslow, Jerry Rose, George Michael Evica, and Charles Drago. This panel became the subject of an article by a journalist who attended the conference.

Filmography
 Cuba: Lost in the Shadows (2011), a documentary in which Hemming plays a key role.

References

Further reading

 Dick Russell (Apr. 1976). "An EX-CIA Man's Stunning Revelations on 'The Company,' JFK's Murder, and the Plot to Kill Richard Nixon." Interview with Gerry Patrick Hemming. Argosy, pp. 25-28, 51-54. Archived from the original.

External links
Gerry Patrick Hemming at IMDb
Gerry Patrick Hemming at Spartacus Educational
Gerry Patrick Hemming at the Weisberg Collection
 FBI-HSCA Subject File at Mary Ferrell Foundation
Primary source collection at Latinamericanstudies.org
Personal background FOIA documents (199 pages)

1937 births
2008 deaths
People of the Central Intelligence Agency
United States Marines
People associated with the assassination of John F. Kennedy
People from Los Angeles
People from Fayetteville, North Carolina
American anti-communists